Sünköy is a village in the Elazığ District of Elazığ Province in Turkey. Its population is 307 (2021). The village is populated by Kurds and is the village of Gültan Kışanak.

References

Villages in Elazığ District
Kurdish settlements in Elazığ Province